The canton of Douai is an administrative division of the Nord department, northern France. It was created at the French canton reorganisation which came into effect in March 2015. Its seat is in Douai.

It consists of the following communes:

Courchelettes
Cuincy
Douai
Esquerchin
Flers-en-Escrebieux
Lambres-lez-Douai
Lauwin-Planque

References

Cantons of Nord (French department)